Case Conrad is an Indie rock band of four Swedes and one Portuguese, formed in 2009 and spread out between Malmö, Sweden, and Barcelona, Spain. Their sound has been described as "folk-and-surf-inflected dream pop" by magazine Creative Loafing.

Gustav Haggren, who formed the group in 2009, says in an interview with Raw And Unheard regarding the band's sound:  “I am sure all and neither genre fits. It’s pop songs that we try to play as honest as we can: we experiment, push both our own and each other's limits, but most important is that we aim to keep the process playful and fun, not matter how dark a song may be.”

Case Conrad has done several tours in the US and Germany. Gustav Haggren has been featured on compilations together with Be Good Tanyas and J. Tillman and has had music featured in film and TV.

Case Conrad’s third album A Tightrope Wish was recorded in Sauerland, Germany, most of it tracked live in the course of five days. The album was recorded and mixed by Michael Vögler and produced by the band. The album will come out September 2016 on Stargazer Records/This Is Forte.

The eleven songs features songwriting from both Gustav Haggren and Per Henrik Adolfsson and just like on previous album, Leikko, Haggren and Adolfsson share the lead vocalist post. The songs speak of the mysterious inner and outer worlds that the band has experienced in the past two years, both in their personal lives and during tours in Europe and USA.

The band’s geographical situation can be noticed in "The Swim" where Haggren sings about a love affair to the docks of Hamburg and Barcelona – a song that was written in his own port city of Malmö and captures the urge to look for the impossible.

History

Formation to A Tightrope Wish: 2009 – 2016
The band was formed in 2009 when Gustav Haggren decided to put the band Gustav and the Seasick Sailors to rest after five years and three albums. He formed a sort of a super group by calling up Petter Bengtsson (Shooting John), Robert Johansson (The Tarantula Waltz) and Gustav Bjarnason.

The members had all been in different musical groups in the past and found the structure of a band somewhat boring and predictable. So instead they formed a project, called The Case of Conrad, soon they shortened it to Case Conrad.

The group went on tour immediately to build their sound, which resulted in a two-day live recording in the Stockholm archipelago, which resulted in Dew Point. After the album release the band went back on the road, this time a three-month coast-to-coast tour in the US (the band went with no shows booked and ended up playing 55 shows in three months).

After the trip they ended up in Barcelona where a songwriter and friend of Haggren was living: Per Henrik Adolfsson, also known as Pancake. Soon it was decided that Adolfsson was joining Case Conrad in the making of their second album Leikko. Now Case Conrad was a band of two vocalists. The album was recorded by the band themselves, learning as they went along in peoples flats. They kept having to move around because of cockroaches, neighbors and other technical interference.

Drums were recorded by John Roger Olsson (The Grand Opening) in Malmö. The mix was finally sent to Cristoffer Roth (The Concretes, Moneybrother) for mixing.

The album Leikko was well received. It came out on Stargazer Records and the band soon signed a publishing deal with FatCat Records. In 2015 Case Conrad returned to the US for 32 new dates where they played shows with The Pines and King of Prussia among others.

Returning from that tour, Case Conrad once again acted in a non-typical band sense. Haggren went back to Sweden to study creative writing, Robert Johansson opened a Ramen-restaurant in Barcelona and Adolfsson started making art and having exhibitions. Bengtsson as well as the newest and fifth member Vasco Batista performed with other projects, Bengtsson drumming with Ash & Iron and Batista fronting Big Summer.

In 2016 Case Conrad is back together as a band like it was the most natural thing in the world. On 30 September, A Tightrope Wish will come out on Stargazer Records and This Is Forte. Case Conrad's long-distant relationship between Barcelona, Spain and Malmö, Sweden seems to be working out. Like Gustav Haggren sings in the final epic track "Blood" on kick drums on the new album: All we’ve done’s been proven wrong, yet we were right all along.

Band members

 Gustav Haggren Vocals, Guitar
 Per Henrik Adolfsson Vocals, Guitar, Synthesizers
 Robert Johansson Lead guitar, Piano, Organ, Synthesizers
 Petter Bengtsson Drums, Percussion, Back vocals
 Vasco Batista Bass, Back vocals

Discography

Albums

Singles

Music videos

Press Quotes

 Creative Loafing"A set of organic, cohesive compositions that fuse the bright guitar pop of Soft Swells to the vulnerable urgency of Yo La Tengo, the hushed dynamics of Belle and Sebastian to the cloudy melancholy of '80s cult icons the Chameleons."
 Nordic By Nature”once it’s drilled firmly in your head, you won’t get rid of it! Ahhh! BUT that’s a sign of a good indie pop song right?!”
 Hillydilly”what really has this act standing out is the lead vocalist who displays his wonderful timbre within the track.”
 Raw And Unheard”Between the immense emotional build of the track and the strong, visually impressive lyrics…”Copper Thief” is a melancholic triumph.”
 Indieed"Charismatic voices bedded on a bed of perfect played indie folk rock."
 Spindle Magazine"Case Conrad, a band of now four Swedes and a Portuguese, have progressed into something harmonic and promising- impressing through music and personality"
 Lydelic In Barcelona”Their indie pop songs like ballads, warm and upbeat, transformed the whole place into a dream-like scene.”
 Daytrotter"It turns out that this pain and worry that he might not have wanted anything to do with when it first arrived, is actually a wonderful muse, and everyone knows that there should be no fucking with a muse because even when you don't want one, you know that you need one."

References

External links
Official Website

Swedish rock music groups
Swedish indie rock groups
Musical groups established in 2009